Patrick Devlin may refer to:

Pat Devlin (American football) (born 1988), American football quarterback
Pat Devlin (footballer) (born 1953), Irish footballer and manager
Patrick Devlin, Baron Devlin (1905–1992), British law lord
L. Patrick Devlin, professor of communication at the University of Rhode Island
Paddy Devlin (1925–1999), Northern Irish politician